Gordon Horsfield (24 March 1913 – 25 August 1982) was an Australian cricketer. He played five first-class matches for New South Wales between 1934/35 and 1941/42.

See also
 List of New South Wales representative cricketers

References

External links
 

1913 births
1982 deaths
Australian cricketers
New South Wales cricketers
Cricketers from Sydney